Cyprian Consiglio, O.S.B. Cam., is an American composer, musician, Camaldolese monk and Catholic priest. He is noted for his musical work to support the practice of meditation. He is the author of two books.

Life 
He was born in 1958 as Phillip Daniel Consiglio and grew up near Joliet, Illinois. He later spent many years living in Phoenix, Arizona, where he worked as a professional musician, performer (guitarist and vocalist), arranger and producer.

Consiglio began his recording career in his early twenties, and has since gone on to record numerous collections of original music in a wide variety of styles. Though much of his early work was in Catholic liturgical music much of his latest work incorporates styles and sacred texts from a wide variety of cultures and spiritual traditions.

In 1992 Consiglio was admitted as a candidate of the Camaldolese Hermitage of the Immaculate Heart (better known as New Camaldoli) in Big Sur, California. In 1998 he earned a Master's degree in theology from St. John Seminary in Camarillo, California and was ordained a Catholic priest in July of that year. He has spent a considerable amount of time studying both Eastern and Western spirituality, particularly under the influence of Bede Griffiths. After his monastic formation and ten years living at New Camaldoli Hermitage, he re-located near Santa Cruz, California, and lived ten years in a hermitage where he spent about half of his time on the road performing concerts, and teaching or leading retreats mainly on the topic of the Universal Call to Contemplation. He made regular trips to India and other Asian countries, "learning and teaching." In the fall of 2012 he resumed living at New Camaldoli.

In July 2013 Consiglio was elected the prior of the hermitage after the previous prior, Robert Hale, O.S.B. Cam., informed the community that he was stepping down. Consiglio was installed as prior on July 20, 2013, and reconfirmed for another six-year term at the end of January 2018.

Partial discography
 There Is A Light (NALR, 1992)
 Behind and Before Me (OCP, 1996)
 As One Unknown (OCP, 1998)
 In the Heart of the Desert w/ John Pennington (OCP, 1999)
 Awakening w/John Pennington (Equilibrium, 2002)
 Lord, Open My Lips (OCP, 2003)
 The Song of Luke (Equilibrium, 2004)
 Wait, My Soul, In Silence w/Laurence Freeman, O.S.B. (MedioMedia, 2005)
 Compassionate and Wise (Equilibrium, 2006)
 Echo of Your Peace (MedioMedia, 2008)

Bibliography

External links 
 Official website 2021 archive 
 OCP publications bio

1958 births
Living people
People from Joliet, Illinois
Camaldolese Order
St. John's Seminary (California) alumni
American male composers
21st-century American composers
American Roman Catholic religious writers
Catholics from Illinois
21st-century American male musicians
21st-century American Roman Catholic priests